was a Japanese professional sumo wrestler from Shiroishi, Miyagi Prefecture. He was the sport's 18th yokozuna.

Early life and career
He was born in Misawa, Otakazawa in present-day Shiroishi City, and was called "Monster child of Misawa" (三沢の怪童, "Misawa no Kaidai"). Kakubari was known for his large and strong body, and, at the age of 13, it was said that he could easily carry two bales of rice.
At an unknown age he was spotted by the wife of a former rikishi of the Isenoumi stable, who heard rumors of the boy's excellent physique, and in the spring of 1884 he moved to Tokyo and joined the Oguruma stable at age 17. Despite his outward appearance, he was reputed as a fine-tuned, quick-witted man, good at arithmetic and a good debater. He was also a good salesman during the traveling tournaments. Having scored a make-kochi record (3 wins and 6 losses), he was however promoted thanks to the impression he left on the crowds thanks to his size. Ōzutsu reached sekiwake only three tournaments after entering the top makuuchi division. His strength increased and he was promoted to ōzeki in May 1899.

Yokozuna career
In May 1902, he had the best record in the tournament with no defeats. At some point, he was advised to assume the ring name of past yokozuna Tanikaze Kajinosuke, which was supposed to be his legacy within the Tokyo Sumo Association since both of them were from Miyagi Prefecture, but he declined saying that he did not want to become a laughingstock in the future.
However, his strength rapidly declined after taking part in the Russo-Japanese War. He was absent for three tournaments due to the war.

Fighting style
Despite being gifted with a great strenght and body, Ōzutsu struggled at the beginning of his career, and people said "he was clumsy and weak in the waist" and "could never win a bout because he was too big for his own good". With time, he began to take advantage of his strength by prodding from afar and pulling in slowly. While not being an agile person, he developed a method preventing his adversary to stand up, he would catch them with his favoured right hand grip and hold them down, never letting go.

Retirement and death
After his return from the war, his chronic rheumatism had worsened and Ōzutsu sat out the 1907 second tournament. He chose to retire in the next year, assuming the name of Matsuchiyama. In his retirement speech, he said that former yokozuna Umegatani Tōtarō I had taught him that a yokozuna must not be defeated. In the top makuuchi division, he won 98 bouts and lost 29 bouts, recording a winning percentage of 77.2. He also recorded 51 draws. In 1915, he was hospitalized with a stomach ulcer on his back and became seriously ill. He died on May 27, 1918 of diabetes that he developed after the surgery at 48 years old.His grave is located in the premises of the Ekō-in temple in Tokyo.

Homage

A bronze statue of Ōzutsu was erected at the ruins of Shiroishi Castle, Shiroishi, Miyagi.

Top division record

  
    
    
  
  
    
    
  
  
    
    
  
  
    
    
  
  
    
    
  
  
    
    
  
  
    
    
  
  
    
    
  
  
    
    
  
  
    
    
  
  
    
    
  
  
    
    
  
  
    
    
  
  
    
    
  
  
    
    
  
  
    
    
  
  
    
  

*Championships for the best record in a tournament were not recognised or awarded before the 1909 summer tournament and the above unofficial championships are historically conferred. For more information see yūshō.

See also

Glossary of sumo terms
List of past sumo wrestlers
List of yokozuna

References

1869 births
1918 deaths
Japanese sumo wrestlers
Yokozuna
Sumo people from Miyagi Prefecture
Place of death missing